Laggan (Lagan, Gaelic for 'little hollow') is the name of numerous places in Scotland, including:

Laggan, Badenoch
Laggan, Great Glen
Laggan, Islay
Laggan Dam on the River Spean south west of Loch Laggan
Kinloch Laggan, hamlet at the north end of Loch Laggan
Loch Laggan, Highland
River Laggan, Islay
and outwith Scotland:
Laggan, New South Wales, Australia
Laggan, County Donegal, Ireland, see Porthall
and also:

See also
Lagan (disambiguation)